Aghbolagh-e Chamanlu (also Romanized as Āghbolāgh-e Chamanlū) is a village in Qaleh Darrehsi Rural District, in the Central District of Maku County, West Azerbaijan Province, Iran. At the 2006 census, its population was 126, in 28 families.

References 

 Tageo

Populated places in Maku County